Jennifer Weiner (born March 28, 1970) is an American writer, television producer, and journalist. She is based in Philadelphia, Pennsylvania. Her debut novel, published in 2001, was Good in Bed. Her novel In Her Shoes (2002) was made into a movie starring Cameron Diaz, Toni Collette, and Shirley MacLaine.

Background and education
Weiner was born to a Jewish family in DeRidder, Louisiana, where her father was stationed as an army physician. The next year, her family (including a younger sister and two brothers) moved to Simsbury, Connecticut, where Weiner spent her childhood.

When Weiner was 16, her father abandoned the family. He died of a crack cocaine overdose in 2008.

Her first novel, Good in Bed, is loosely based on her young-adult life: like the main character, Cannie Shapiro, Weiner's parents divorced when she was 16, and her mother came out as a lesbian at age 55.

Weiner has said that she was "one of only nine Jewish kids in her high school class of 400" at Simsbury High School. She entered Princeton University at the age of 17 and graduated summa cum laude with an A.B. in English in 1991 after completing an 86-page-long senior thesis titled "'Never Far From Mother --' On the Uses of Essentialism in Novels and Films."

At Princeton, Weiner studied with J. D. McClatchy, Ann Lauterbach, John McPhee, Toni Morrison, and Joyce Carol Oates. Her first published story, "Tour of Duty," appeared in Seventeen in 1992.

Career
After graduating from college, Weiner joined the Centre Daily Times, the daily newspaper of State College, Pennsylvania, where she managed the education beat and wrote a regular column called "Generation XIII" (referring to the 13th generation following the American Revolution), aka "Generation X." From there, she moved on to Kentucky's Lexington Herald-Leader, still penning her "Generation XIII" column, before finding a job with The Philadelphia Inquirer as a features reporter. She continued to write for the Inquirer, freelancing on the side for Mademoiselle, Seventeen, and other publications, until after her first novel, Good in Bed, was published in 2001. In 2005, her second novel, In Her Shoes (2002), was made into a feature film starring Cameron Diaz, Toni Collette and Shirley MacLaine by 20th Century Fox. Her sixth novel, Best Friends Forever, was a No. 1 New York Times bestseller and made Publishers Weekly's list of the longest-running bestsellers of the year. To date, she is the author of nine bestselling books, including eight novels and a collection of short stories, with a reported 11 million copies in print in 36 countries. Her novel The Next Best Thing was published by Simon & Schuster in July 2012. Her writing on gender and culture appears frequently in The New York Times.

In addition to writing fiction, Weiner is a co-creator and executive producer of the (now-cancelled) ABC Family sitcom State of Georgia, and she is known for "live-tweeting" episodes of the reality dating shows The Bachelor and The Bachelorette. In 2011, TIME named her to its list of the Top 140 Twitter Feeds "shaping the conversation." She is a self-described feminist.

Criticism of gender bias in the media
Weiner has been a vocal critic of what she sees as the male bias in the publishing industry and the media, alleging that books by male authors are better received than those written by women, that is, reviewed more often and more highly praised by critics. In 2010, she told The Huffington Post, "I think it's a very old and deep-seated double standard that holds that when a man writes about family and feelings, it's literature with a capital L, but when a woman considers the same topics, it's romance, or a beach book – in short, it's something unworthy of a serious critic's attention. ... I think it's irrefutable that when it comes to picking favorites – those lucky few writers who get the double reviews AND the fawning magazine profile AND the back-page essay space AND the op-ed ... the Times tends to pick white guys." In a 2011 interview with The Wall Street Journal blog Speakeasy, she said, "There are gatekeepers who say chick lit doesn’t deserve attention but then they review Stephen King." When Jonathan Franzen's novel Freedom was published in 2010 to critical acclaim and extensive media coverage (including a cover story in TIME), Weiner criticized what she saw as the ensuing "overcoverage," igniting a debate over whether the media's adulation of Franzen was an example of entrenched sexism within the literary establishment. Though Weiner received some backlash from other female writers for her criticisms, a 2011 study by the organization VIDA bore out many of her claims, and Franzen himself, in an interview with The Daily Telegraph, agreed with her: "To a considerable extent, I agree. When a male writer simply writes adequately about family, his book gets reviewed seriously, because: 'Wow, a man has actually taken some interest in the emotional texture of daily life', whereas with a woman it’s liable to be labelled chick-lit. There is a long-standing gender imbalance in what goes into the canon, however you want to define the canon."

As for the label "chick lit", Weiner has expressed ambivalence towards it, embracing the genre it stands for while criticizing its use as a pejorative term for commercial women's fiction. "I’m not crazy about the label," she has said, "because I think it comes with a built-in assumption that you’ve written nothing more meaningful or substantial than a mouthful of cotton candy. As a result, critics react a certain way without ever reading the books." In 2008, Weiner published a critique on her blog of a review by Curtis Sittenfeld of a Melissa Bank novel. Weiner deconstructs Sittenfeld's review, writing, "The more I think about the review, the more I think about the increasingly angry divide between ladies who write literature and chicks who write chick lit, the more it seems like a grown-up version of the smart versus pretty games of years ago; like so much jockeying for position in the cafeteria and mocking the girls who are nerdier/sluttier/stupider than you to make yourself feel more secure about your own place in the pecking order."

In November 2019, Weiner participated in the harassment and abuse of Brooke Nelson, a college student who was mentioned in her local newspaper as saying she thought that author Sarah Dessen's YA novels were not suitable for the Common Read program run by Northern State University, Aberdeen, and that she had advocated for the inclusion of civil rights attorney Bryan Stevenson's memoir, Just Mercy, instead. In a series of since-deleted tweets, Weiner described Nelson's opposition to Dessen's inclusion in the Common Reads program as "catty and cruel", part of "systemic discrimination" against young women, and linked it to coverage of gymnastics doctor Larry Nassar's repeated sexual assaults on young women. She later stated that she had "zero regrets" regarding these remarks. When the story was reported in Jezebel, The Guardian, the Washington Post, and Slate, Weiner reportedly regretted her actions.

Film adaptations and television appearances

In Her Shoes
In Her Shoes (2002) was made into a major motion picture in 2005 with Cameron Diaz,  Toni Collette and Shirley MacLaine. She also made a cameo appearance in this film.

State of Georgia
After signing a development deal with ABC Family in 2008, Weiner wrote a pilot for a half-hour sitcom with producer Jeff Greenstein (Desperate Housewives), originally called The Great State of Georgia and starring a plus-sized young woman who aspires to be a Broadway star. In 2010, the network ordered the show to series (renamed State of Georgia), and it went on to air 12 episodes in the summer of 2011. On September 16, Weiner announced the show's cancellation via Twitter.

Television appearances
Weiner made her TV debut on The Tony Danza Show in 2005, reappearing in 2006. She made a cameo appearance as herself in the Younger episode "The Jade Crusade" in 2016.

Personal life
Weiner married attorney Adam Bonin in October 2001. They have two children and separated in 2010. On March 19, 2016, she married writer Bill Syken.

Bibliography

Novels
 Good in Bed (2001) – Chronicles the experiences of Candace Shapiro, a Jewish journalist from Philadelphia. The plot of the story revolves around the distress that comes from leading an unstable love life while trying to balance a professional career. Candace learns the positive benefits of being independent during tough times in her life. Weiner often acknowledges the influence that her personal history played in her first official novel.
 In Her Shoes (2002) – Published in September 2002, In Her Shoes tells the story of two sisters who have nothing in common, except their shoe size, and a grandmother neither of them ever knew. USA Today says the book “will make you laugh and possibly cry.” In October 2005, the novel was turned into a major motion picture, starring Cameron Diaz, Toni Collette and Shirley Maclaine.
 Little Earthquakes (2004) – This book contains the story of a newscaster, Ayinde, who moves to Philadelphia following her husband who is an NBA player for the 76ers. She becomes friends with Becky and Kelly and together they created an unbreakable sisterhood bond.
 Goodnight Nobody (2005) – This story follows the story of Kate Klein who relocates her family and herself to Upchurch, Connecticut. She lives the suburban mom lifestyle and later spends her time starting an investigation, along with two of her friends, about the death of Kitty Cavanaugh.
 The Guy Not Taken (2006) – This is a collection of eleven separate stories from Weiner. The stories cover many subject areas, from a teenage girl coping with the loss of her father, to a widow opening up her home to a pair of homeless girls.
 Certain Girls (2008) – Certain Girls is the sequel to Good In Bed. Released in April 2008, it begins where Cannie, the heroine of Good In Bed left off with her debut novel becoming an overnight bestseller.
 Best Friends Forever (2009) - Two childhood friends named Valerie Adler and Adelaide "Addie" Downs are reunited when Valerie believes she accidentally ran over the star football player at their high school reunion.
 Fly Away Home (2010)
 Then Came You (2011)
 The Next Best Thing (2012)
 All Fall Down (2014)
 Who Do You Love (2015) – This story is about two young children who meet in a hospital and are forced to part ways. Thinking that they will never see each other again, they move on with their lives, only to later end up in the presence of each other, where they must decide if their love can keep them together.
 Mrs. Everything (2019)
 Big Summer (2020)
That Summer (2021)

Short stories
 Disconnected (2013)
 Recalculating (2011)
 Swim (2012)
 The Half Life (2010)
 A Memoir of Grief (2012)
 Good Men (2013)

Nonfiction
Hungry Heart: Adventures in Life, Love, and Writing (2016)

Essays
“Victoria’s Secret Finally Set Its Angels Free. Better Late Than Never.” (New York Times, June 17, 2021)

References

Further reading
 Black, Robin. "President Obama: Why Don't You Read More Women?" Salon.com, August 24, 2011.
 Ganahl, Jane. "A feminist fights back against 'chick lit' label." San Francisco Chronicle, October 30, 2005.
 Gervin, Cari Wade. "In Defense of Chick Lit: Jennifer Weiner, 'Women's Fiction,' and Franzenfreude a Year Later." Metro Pulse, September 7, 2011.
 Jacobs, Julie. "Jennifer Weiner: Chic lit ." Hillel.org, July 6, 2007.
 Mead, Rebecca. "Written Off" The New Yorker, January 13, 2014. A full Profile.  
 Perry, Beth. "Happy Endings." People, September 26, 2005.
 Olya, Gabrielle. "Jennifer Weiner Is Posing in her Swimsuit to Promote Body Confidence." People, July 6, 2016.

External links
 Official website
 Author page on Simon & Schuster website
 Goodreads.com Author page
 2010 radio interview at The Bat Segundo Show
 State of Georgia official website
 

1970 births
21st-century American novelists
American feminist writers
American women novelists
American chick lit writers
Jewish women writers
Living people
The Philadelphia Inquirer people
Writers from Philadelphia
Princeton University alumni
Jewish American novelists
21st-century American women writers
People from DeRidder, Louisiana
Novelists from Pennsylvania
21st-century American Jews